Rent-A-Girlfriend is an anime series adapted from the manga series of the same title written by Reiji Miyajima. The first season was animated by TMS Entertainment and directed by Kazuomi Koga, with Mitsutaka Hirota handling series composition, Kanna Hirayama designing the characters, and Hyadain composing the music. The Peggies performed the opening theme . Halca performed the first ending theme  starting from Episodes 2–6 and 8–11, while Halca also performed the second ending theme "First Drop" for Episode 7, and Sora Amamiya performed the third ending theme  for Episode 12. It aired from July 11 to September 26, 2020 on the Super Animeism programming block on MBS and other networks.


Episode list

Notes

References

External links
  
 

2020 Japanese television seasons